Ciclobendazole is an anthelmintic, that is a pharmaceutical drug against parasitic worms. It underwent a clinical trial in the 1970s, where it was found to be as effective as mebendazole in the treatment of hookworm infection and ascariasis, but significantly less effective in the treatment of trichuriasis.

It is not known to be marketed anywhere in the world.

References 

Anthelmintics
Aromatic ketones
Benzimidazoles
Carbamates
Cyclopropyl compounds